Hard Rock Hell is a three day music festival held at Vauxhall Holiday resort, Great Yarmouth. It was previously held at Hafan y Môr Holiday Park, Pwllheli, Gwynedd, North Wales, and up until 2011 at Pontin's Holiday Village, Prestatyn, Wales. Holding the festival in a holiday camp gives the organisers pre-built venues and stages and because of the on-site accommodation allows them to hold a multi day festival over winter/spring months when outdoor camping is not desirable. The first edition of the festival was held at Butlins Holiday Camp, Minehead, England but the festival relocated to its current location in 2008.

Hard Rock Hell I : The Winter Ball  

The first edition of the Hard Rock Hell festival was subtitled "The Winter Ball". Held at Butlins Holiday Camp, Minehead, England over Friday 9th and Saturday 10 November 2007. The headliners for the first edition of the festival were Cradle of Filth and Twisted Sister.

Hard Rock Hell II : The Dragons Ball  
The second edition of the Hard Rock Hell festival was subtitled "The Dragons Ball". Held at Pontin's Holiday Village, Prestatyn, Wales over Friday 5th and Saturday 6 December 2008, the headliners for the festival were Thin Lizzy and Black Label Society.

Hard Rock Hell III : The Vikings Ball  
The third edition of the Hard Rock Hell festival was subtitled "The Vikings Ball". Held at Pontin's Holiday Village, Prestatyn, Wales over Friday 4th and Saturday 5 December 2009 with a pre-event show on Thursday 3 December, the headliners for the festival were Monster Magnet and Queensrÿche.

Hard Rock Hell IV 

The 4th annual Hard Rock Well was held at Pontin's Holiday Village in Prestatyn, the line-up included Airbourne, 9xDead, Helloween, UFO, Uriah Heep, Skid Row and MSG.

Hard Rock Hell V 

The 5th edition of Hard Rock Hell was held at Pontins in Prestatyn, the theme was Village of the Damned, the line-up included Airbourne, Diamond Head, Enuff Z'Nuff, FM, Helloween, JettBlack, LA Guns, Lizzy Borden, MSG, Paul D'ianno, Pretty Boy Floyd, Saxon, Skid Row, Stratovarius, UFO and Uriah Heep.

Hard Rock Hell VI : A Fistful Of Rock  

Hard Rock Hell VI took place on 29 November to 3 December 2012 at Hafan Y Môr Holiday Park, Pwllheli, Gwynedd, North Wales, LL53 6HJ.

Hard Rock Hell VII: Cirque Du Rock 

Took place from 28 November to 1 December 2013 in Hafan y Môr Holiday Park, Pwllheli, Gwynedd, North Wales.

Hard Rock Hell VIII: HRH Helloween (sic)

Returns to Haven Holidays, Hafan y Môr Holiday Park, Pwllheli, Gwynedd, North Wales from Thursday 13th to Sunday 16 November 2014.

The event completely sold out on 13/05/14.

W.A.S.P. return to HRH to headline the Friday night, and Blue Öyster Cult top the bill on Saturday, other acts announced include M.S.G., Y&T, Diamond Head, Bonafide, Electric Mary, Krokus, Vardis, Grifters, Heavy Metal Kids, and Carousel Vertigo. 
The latest additions are Big Elf, Truckfighters, Witchrider, Massive, Chemia, The Black Marbles, Thundermother, The Brew, Piston and Buffalo Summer.
More bands will be announced in due course.

Hard Rock Hell X: HRH 10th Anniversary
Returned to Haven Holidays, Hafan y Môr Holiday Park, Pwllheli, Gwynedd, North Wales from Thursday 10 November to Saturday 12 November 2016

Bands included Ugly Kid Joe, Ratt, Living Colour, Hayseed Dixie, Last In Line, Graham Bonnet Band, Phil Campbell’s All Starr Band, Ricky Warwick & The Fighting Hearts, Bonfire, Sweet Savage, The Vintage Caravan, Lionize, The Treatment, Massive, The Amorettes, Vodun, Aaron Buchanan & The Cult Classics, Hand Of Dimes, The Last Vegas, Dear Lord Hailmary, Tequila Mockingbyrd, Black Aces, 4Bitten, Joan of Arc, Syteria, The Mojo Sinners, Welcome Back Delta, Dorje, The Texas Flood, Chase The Ace, Skam, Crowsaw, Theia, Departed, and Soil.

Hard Rock Hell XI: Knights of the Dark Order 
Airbourne, Black Star Riders, Dee Snider, Idlewar, Y&T, Lynch Mob, The New Roses and Tyketto, along with home grown talent including Bad Touch, Gun, Buffalo Summer, Chasing Dragons and Wayward Sons rocked the masses at Hard Rock Hell XI, which was held at Camp HRH in Pwllheli, North Wales.

Saturday night headliners Black Star Riders describe themselves as "lifers in an industry less secure than a secret in a soap opera." Formed from recent members of Thin Lizzy, Black Star Riders have been described as the next step in the evolution of the legendary band.

The Graveltones are a crowd-rousing two-piece heavy blues/rock and roll band, influenced by great artists such as Captain Beefheart, John Lee Hooker and Queens of The Stone Age.

Wayward Sons were formed last year by Toby Jepson (former frontman of GUN and Little Angels). "I feel I have unfinished business," Toby explained, "stories still left to tell, points to make, noise to create; all of the above." HRH XI is proud to present this established artist’s latest project.

Other acts joining the festival’s super tasty line-up include Toseland, Swiss rockers Sideburn, the big bluesy Southern-tinged rock of Buffalo Summer, psych rockers Goldray, and the descendants of Taint: Hark and the powerful three piece from California Idlewa, Dead City Ruins, Bad Touch, Western Sand, The Blanko, The Brink, King Creature, Black Whiskey, Wicked Stone, Those Damn Crows, King Breaker, Kikamora, Blind River, Chasing Dragons, Bad Dog, Killit, and Beth Blade & the Beautiful Disasters.

These artists join acts already announced for HRH XI: Dee Snider, Airbourne, Reef, Lynch Mob, Y&T, Tyketto, GUN, Von Hertzen Brothers, Black Aces, Burnt Out Wreck, The New Roses, Syron Vanes, Killcode, Florence Black, Syteria, The Jokers, Fire Red Empress, The Cut, and Louder Still.

Hard Rock Hell XII: Goes Over The Top 

Arenas Performance Slot Times

Hard Rock Hell XIII : Rise Of The Dead  
Held at Camp HRH, Vauxhall Holiday Park, Acle New Road, Great Yarmouth. NR30 1TB

https://clashfinder.com/s/hrhxiii/?user=0rz0hz.yn

References:-

External links
Official Website

Heavy metal festivals in the United Kingdom
Music festivals in Wales
Music festivals established in 2007